Kibinai, kybyn, or kibin (plural in Karaim language: kybynlar / Qıbınlar (Common Turkic Latin); singular in Lithuanian: kibinas) are traditional pastries filled with mutton and onion, popular with the Karaite ethnic minority in Lithuania. As everything Karaite in Lithuania, they are mostly associated with the city of Trakai. English-language travel guides compare them to Cornish pasties.
Initially, they come from Crimea from where the Grand Duke of Lithuania Vytautas the Great took Tatar and Karaite families to become their guards in order to thank them for their help during his fight against the Golden Horde.

See also

	
 List of stuffed dishes
 Empanada
 Chebureki
 Meat pie
 Turnover (food)
 Sambusak
 Samsa (food)

References

Lithuanian cuisine
Lithuanian desserts